Chris Oliver may refer to:

 Chris Oliver (American football), American college football coach, head football coach at Lindsey Wilson College
 Chris Oliver (footballer) (born 1982), Kangaroos AFL footballer
 Chris Oliver (software engineer), Sun Microsystems software engineer
 Chris Oliver (surgeon) (born 1960), British surgeon and professor

See also
 Criss Oliva (1963–1993), guitarist